Talking God is the ninth crime fiction novel in the Joe Leaphorn / Jim Chee Navajo Tribal Police series by Tony Hillerman published in 1989.

One murdered man near Gallup and the desecration of a Northeastern cemetery, protesting ineffectively the keeping of native American bones in the Smithsonian, lead Leaphorn and Chee, separately, to Washington D.C. to solve interlinked crimes and preserve Navajo cultural artifacts.

Plot summary

An unidentified man is found dead along the railroad tracks near Gallup, New Mexico. There is a note in one pocket of his suit referring to Agnes Tsotsie and a Yeibichai or Night Chant ceremony. FBI agent Kennedy calls on Lt. Leaphorn to aid in finding footprints near the body. There are no footprints to follow, but the note sends him to interview Agnes Tsotsie, who shows him the letter from Henry Highhawk, who will attend her Night Chant. Always curious, Leaphorn learns that an Amtrak train made an emergency stop in the desert, the likely explanation for the body found near the railroad tracks with no footprints around him. The man's left-behind luggage is now stored in Washington D.C. Leaphorn takes his vacation in Washington D.C. to follow up on Pointed Shoes. Leaphorn talks with Roland Dockery and Peres of Amtrak, who show him the luggage, which holds a useful notebook. Peres saw the man now known to be the killer of Pointed Toes. The notebook includes the name and prescription number for a medicine he took, revealing both the name and address of Elogio Santillanes. Leaphorn proceeds to inform the next of kin, who are rather quiet in receiving the news. He then notices that their next door neighbor matches the description of the killer. As Santillanes was tortured, Leaphorn suspects the family home might be bugged, so leaves them with the sad news. Leaphorn calls Kennedy to match fingerprints under the victim's proper name. Leaphorn calls the NTP, learning that Chee was arresting officer for Highhawk and is now in D.C.

An arrest warrant is issued for Henry Highhawk, who stole human remains from a New England cemetery and then crossed state lines. Highhawk is attending a Night Chant ceremony on the Navajo Reservation, where Jim Chee arrests him with aid from his friend Cowboy Dashee, for the FBI. Chee sees the masks that are integral to the last day of the ceremony. Chee gets a letter from Mary Landon, his longtime love, saying he should not come to Wisconsin; they cannot resolve the cultural barrier between them. Minutes later, his friend Janet Pete calls him from Washington, D.C. Her newest client is Henry Highhawk, and she is afraid on several counts. Chee leaves to visit her, meeting Highhawk and Rudolfo Gomez on his first night in town. Pete points out the man she thinks is following her. Chee confronts him and he drives off. Chee visits Highhawk at his office in the museum, seeing the accurate detail of an upcoming exhibit on Masked Gods of the Americas, including the Navajo Talking God mask. Highhawk takes a phone call, telling Chee he will be back shortly. Chee leaves when Highhawk does not return, walking out past an unguarded exit.

The next morning, Leaphorn goes to Chee's hotel, updating each other on why they came to Washington. They realize that both Gomez and Santelleros were tortured in Chile, must be leftists in exile, and are still hunted. Leaphorn calls his friend Captain Rodney, who joins them. Rodney knows Chee's name as having signed into the museum the night before, but not out. Rodney tells them of the murder of Mrs. Yokum, the guard. The three men find Highhawk's body in a museum storage bin, after Chee has maintenance look for something out of place as the guide to the emptied bin. They find Highhawk's tape recorder wired to his watch, and a replica Talking God mask. Leaphorn and Chee figure out why Gomez /Santerro sought a connection with Highhawk, and the danger of the proximity of Highhawk's exhibit to the Incan exhibit.

The Chileans will not pay Leroy Fleck, their hired assassin, because the victim is identified. Fleck's revenge is to kill as many Chileans as he can, trailing them to the exhibit of Incan masks in the Natural History Museum with a high ranking general from the present rightist government, the same goal that brings Santerro. The Inca exhibit draws media coverage when the Chileans arrive. The Chilean leftists want to kill the rightists in Washington, and used Highhawk to set up the explosives. Tensions mount as Chee pulls apart the exhibit to find the plastic explosives packed under the mask, and Leaphorn kicks apart the remote detonator that falls from Santerro's hands. Fleck is shot twice by the Chilean body guard in the museum, after he kills the general and The Client with his shank, a very sharp tool.

Leaphorn heads right back to Window Rock. The police tell Chee that Highhawk was found dead, killed by Santerro, who escaped. Chee finds a Tano Pueblo fetish in the trunk of Highhawk's car, and gives it to Janet Pete to return it to the Tano people, who are connected to her law firm. Mary Landon calls Chee, glad to hear him alive, but they end their relationship. Chee heads home.

Characters

At Navajo Nation and in Washington D.C.
Joe Leaphorn: Lieutenant in the Navajo Tribal Police (NTP) at the Window Rock, Arizona, past 50 years old, widowed one year earlier, decided to continue his police work.
Jim Chee: Officer in the Navajo Tribal Police at the Shiprock, New Mexico office, under Capt. Largo. He is about 30, and has trained to be a hatahalii. He has done the Blessing Way for a few people, including Joe Leaphorn.
Henry Highhawk: Employed as conservator in a Smithsonian museum in Washington, D.C. He dug up graves in New England then crossed state lines after arrest warrant issued. His maternal grandmother was a Navajo, and he claims to be Navajo on her account. Blond haired, tall man, an off kilter idealist.
Rudolfo Gomez: Man at Night Way ceremony for Agnes Tsotsie, who seeks out Highhawk. Chee calls him Bad Hands, for evidence of fingers missing under his gloves. Known as Miguel Santerro to Fleck and The Client. Part of Chile's left wing opposition in exile.

Navajo Nation or nearby
Jay Kennedy: FBI agent for Gallup, New Mexico area.
Bernard St. Germane: Works for major railroad, longtime friend of Leaphorn, his source for information on the Amtrak train.
Elogio Santillanes: Man found dead along the railroad tracks in New Mexico, first called Pointed Shoes, for lack of identification on his person. In life, he was part of the leftist opposition in exile from Chile.
Agnes Tsosie: Navajo elder who is dying of cancer, and has a Night Way or Yeibichai ceremony, a nine-day event, so she can die in peace.
'Cowboy' Albert Dashee, Jr: Hopi man, works as one of the deputies for Coconino County Sheriff’s office in Arizona. He accompanies Chee to the Night Way ceremony, to aid in the arrest.

Washington D.C.
Leroy Fleck: Short but strong middle-aged man, with curly red hair, he is a law breaker and murderer from his childhood. He is tracking Santerro for The Client.
Mrs. Fleck: Mama to Leroy, now old and violent, and the motivation for Leroy to earn the money promised by the client.
Eddie Elkins: A disbarred lawyer and Fleck's contact for the job with The Client, and who receives the tapes recording the Santillanes family next door to Fleck's apartment. They met in prison, decades earlier, when young Fleck had been raped. Elkins taught him how get his own revenge.
The Client: Man who hires Fleck to murder seven people, one by one, for a fee. He will not pay unless each murder goes undetected for a full month. He is part of the Chilean embassy.
P. J. Rodney: Captain in D.C. police and old friend of Leaphorn. They met at the FBI academy early in their careers and now work together.
Peres: Amtrak employee interviewed by Leaphorn in Washington D.C., who describes Fleck as the man in Santillanes's train compartment near Gallup, and who packed up Santillanes's belongings when the man disappeared from the train.
Janet Pete: Formerly a legal aid lawyer for the Navajo Tribal Council, where she met her good friend Chee. She moved to Washington D.C. to work for her former law school professor McDermott who is also her lover. She is the attorney for Highhawk. Pete is half-Navajo.
Mary Landon: Chee's longtime love, now living in Wisconsin. She is not Navajo, and neither can bend to the other one's culture and give up their own. She calls Chee in Washington, after seeing him on the news, and they end their connection.
Dr. Caroline Hartman: Curator of the exhibit in the Natural History Museum on Masked Gods of the Americas.
Mrs. Alice Yokum: Guard at 12th Street entrance to Smithsonian building, killed by Gomez /Santerro.
General Ramon Huerta: High official of the secret police in Chile's government under rightist Pinochet, in Washington D.C. for an official visit.

Geography
In his 2011 book Tony Hillerman's Navajoland: Hideouts, Haunts, and Havens in the Joe Leaphorn and Jim Chee Mysteries, author  has listed the following 29 geographical locations, real and fictional, mentioned in Talking God. 

Baby Rocks, AZ
Bidahochi, AZ
Burnt Water, AZ
Chuska Mountains, NM & AZ
Crownpoint, NM
Defiance Plateau, AZ
Farmington, NM
Fort Defiance, AZ
Fort Wingate, NM
Gallup, NM
Ganado, AZ
Hopi Buttes, AZ
Iyanbito Mesa, NM
Joint Use Reservation, AZ
Lower Greasewood, AZ
Many Farms, AZ
Na Ah Tee (Trading Post), AZ
Naschitti Trading Post, NM
Nashodishgish (Nahodishgish) Mesa, NM
Navajo Mountain, UT & AZ
Painted Desert, AZ
San Juan River, CO, NM, & UT
Shiprock (Community), NM
Tesihim Butte, AZ
Whippoorwill (Spring), AZ
White Cone, AZ
Window Rock, AZ
Zuni Mesa (fictitious location)
Zuni Mountains, NM

Reviews

Kirkus Reviews finds this novel to be minor for Hillerman, yet still far above the average mystery fiction, "vividly peopled, forcefully told".

Another joint venture for Lieut. Joe Leaphorn (a somber, skeptical widower) and Officer Jim Chee (a younger, more mystical sort), Navajo cops whose paths cross once again--this time in Washington, D.C., where separate trails lead both men to shady doings in and around the Smithsonian. Leaphorn is following his hunches about an unidentified murder victim whose body has turned up on the Navajo reservation. The dead man turns out to be a leftist Chilean exile--but what was he doing in Arizona? Meanwhile, Chee gets orders to arrest one Henry Highhawk, an eccentric Smithsonian curator who has come west in search of his marginal Navajo roots. (Along the way, in protest against the Smithsonian's collection of Native American skeletons, Henry has robbed some posh white graves.) And Chee--like Leaphorn, officially "on vacation"--heads for Washington when Henry and his Navajo lawyer (Chee's old chum Janet Pete) appear to be in danger from a skulking thug. . .the very same psycho-for-hire, it turns out, whom Leaphorn is hunting. Hillerman's plot-elements here--an elaborate assassination conspiracy, heaped-up coincidences--are uncharacteristically contrived and implausible. The Washington action, complete with Elmore Leonard-like closeups of the pathetic psycho-hit-man, lacks the intense, unique atmosphere of such series standouts as The Ghostway. Still, if less richly nuanced with Navajo themes and scenes than previous tales, this minor Hillerman remains far-above-average crime fiction: vividly peopled, forcefully told.

Publishers Weekly finds this novel wonderfully readable, but not up to Hillerman's best standards

Hillerman's latest is not quite up to his best standards, but it's still a wonderfully readable, involving mystery. Here he sets Navajo Tribal Police Lieutenant Joe Leaphorn and Officer Jim Chee in Washington, D.C., as each uses vacation time to follow separate cases that will connect in a clash of violence at the Smithsonian Institution's Museum of Natural History. Chee has come at the request of Janet Pete, a Navajo lawyer with a case that involves a ceremonial mask of Yeibichai, or Talking God, maternal grandfather of all the other Navajo gods, and a museum curator named Henry Highhawk, who claims Navajo ancestry and wants to be included on tribal rolls. Leaphorn's interest rises from a puzzling homicide case--an unidentified corpse found near Gallup, N.M., with a note mentioning a pending Yeibichai ceremony. Just as Leaphorn's tenacity reveals the dead man was a leftist Chilean terrorist, Highhawk is killed (in a spooky late-night scene in the Museum) and the pivotal role of the Talking God mask comes into play. Leaphorn's grief over the recent death of his wife, Chee's sorrow at the end of an impossible love affair, both men's sense of alienation in the capital city's urban sophistication suffuse this slim, somewhat contrived, tale with palpable melancholy. Copyright 1989 Reed Business Information, Inc.

Library Journal likes the base in Navajo culture and the intricate plot.

There are three things one can expect from a Hillerman mystery: a story that would make no sense without its rock-solid base of Navaho culture; a tale that moves within the rhythms of real time; and an intricate plot that calls for the particular skills of his two detectives, Jim Chee, shaman and officer of the Navaho Tribal Police, and Lieutenant Joe Leaphorn, older, slower, and wiser. Talking God has all of these things in a plot that absolutely defies summary. Leaphorn and Chee track different paths for different crimes and both end up in the wilds of Washington, D.C., ostensibly on vacation. Instead of the sweet scent of the Southwest, Hillerman has a good time pitting his detectives against the "City of Navy Blue Suits." Welcome as a returning presence is winsome Navaho attorney Janet Pete, who contributes both to the structure of the mystery and to Chee's emotional disharmony. In 1970, LJ 's reviewer described Hillerman's The Blessing Way as "a mystery with literary value; one you can recommend to people who don't like mysteries." Indeed; enjoy. For more on Hillerman, see "Contributing Factors" in this issue, - Ed. -- GraceAnne A. DeCandido, "Library Journal" Copyright 1989 Reed Business Information, Inc.

John M Reilly compares the plotting in this novel to Coyote Waits, the next novel in the series:

But remember that invocation of fate is the solution to the puzzle, not the novel's plot. Coyote Waits may be slighter and less interestingly developed than Talking God, and it is perhaps less satisfying to read because it becomes a demonstration of coincidence rather than dependent order. In plot, however, the two novels are closely related examples of the detection puzzle.

Jonathan Kellerman writing in the Chicago Tribune finds that "Hillerman is a master craftsman of plot and pacing, a demon at characterization, as concerned with the whydunit as the whodunit. . . . In Talking God, his fifteenth book and eleventh full work of fiction, he is at the top of his form." Both Leaphorn ("ruminatively intelligent") and Chee ("occasionally naive but no less effective") are experiencing loss while solving this crime. Leaphorn's wife died, and Chee's long relationship ended. Kellerman notes "this enlarges the story without overpowering it." He concludes  "suffice it to say that the final tapestry is flawless-logical, elegant yet simple, devoid of gimmickry-and that the denouement is immensely suspenseful and smooth as cream."

References

Bibliography

External links
 Hillerman's Foreign Editions: Musings on European Book Cover Illustrations in the Tony Hillerman Portal at UNM library

1989 American novels
Novels by Tony Hillerman
Harper & Row books
Novels set in New Mexico
Novels set in Washington, D.C.